Telangana Vaidya Vidhana Parishad (TGVVP) is one of the divisions of Health and Family Welfare Department of Telangana Government

It was separated from Andhra Pradesh Vaidya Vidhana Parishad, which was established by an act of legislation in 1986. TVVP formed effective 2 June 2014.
 
It exclusively deals with the middle level hospitals of bed strengths ranging from 30 to 350. The posting of the Doctors and the other staff in these hospitals will be carried through the TGVVP.

District Hospitals and Area Hospitals of the Telangana also falls under the category of TGVVP.

Under this 103 area level hospitals, 8 district level hospitals, 233 Ayurvedic and 260 Unani hospitals spread over state.

References

http://www.telangana.gov.in/Other%20Docs/Socio-Economic-outlook-2014.pdf
By Abdul Sattar

State agencies of Telangana
Medical and health government agencies of India
Hospitals in Telangana
2014 establishments in Telangana
Government agencies established in 2014